Elsewhere is a 2019 American comedy-drama film written and directed by Hernán Jiménez and starring Aden Young, Parker Posey, Ken Jeong, Beau Bridges and Jacki Weaver.

Plot
Carpenter Bruno built dream home on father-in-law's property, where daughter Lydia dies, apparently without will access. Bruno's evicted, moving into his dad's shed. Maria (Parker Posey) purchases home and wants remodeling, to which contractor Bruno grudgingly changes decor. An uninterested Bruno dates Marie, and after that romance follows. Whilst removing kitchen's drawer, he finds a false bottom with wife's will in it. During the inauguration party, lawyer and sheriff interrupt it and evict Marie. Bruno returns home, and Marie packs, leaving the house after a sentimental talk with Bruno.

Cast
Aden Young as Bruno
Parker Posey as Marie
Ken Jeong as Felix
Beau Bridges as Dad
Jacki Weaver as Mom
Jackie Tohn as Rita Maloney

References

External links
 
 

American comedy-drama films
2019 comedy-drama films
Films directed by Hernán Jiménez
Films scored by Mark Orton
2010s English-language films
2010s American films